Bethany College is a private liberal arts college in Bethany, West Virginia. Founded in 1840 by Alexander Campbell of the Restoration Movement, who gained support by the Virginia legislature, Bethany College was the first institution of higher education in what is now West Virginia.

History
A liberal arts college, Bethany was chartered on March 2, 1840, by the Virginia legislature and given "all degree-granting powers" of the University of Virginia. West Virginia's secession from Virginia on June 20, 1863, recognized existing Virginia charters; Bethany College continues to operate under the Virginia charter.

It was founded by Alexander Campbell, a minister in the Restoration Movement who provided the land and funds for the first building and served as the first president. Bethany has been a four-year private liberal arts college affiliated with the Christian Church (Disciples of Christ), since its inception. This religious body, of which Campbell was one of the principal founders, continues to support and encourage the college but exercises no sectarian control. An early center of coeducation, Bethany has admitted women since the 1880s.

The college's roots stem from the Buffalo Seminary, founded in 1818, by Campbell; sessions were first held in his mansion in Bethany, home of Alexander Campbell and his father Thomas Campbell. The new Buffalo Seminary, " a continuing education arm of the College" is less than a mile away from the College. 

The college is the birthplace of Delta Tau Delta, an international social fraternity founded in 1858.

During World War II, Bethany was one of 131 colleges nationally that took part in the V-12 Navy College Training Program, which offered students a path to a Navy commission.

A number of campus buildings are contributing resources to the Bethany Historic District. The Historic District was listed on the National Register of Historic Places in 1982. Pendleton Heights was listed in 1975 and the Delta Tau Delta Founders House in 1979.

The campus is also home to the Parkinson Forest, which in 2019 was added to the national Old-Growth Forest Network. The designation identifies the Parkinson Forest as the oldest Old-Growth Forest in Brooke County.

Academics
Bethany College offers a wide selection of studies, awarding Bachelor of Science or Bachelor of Arts degrees in more than 25 fields. If a major does not appeal to a student, Bethany offers students the opportunity to design their own major through the Interdisciplinary program. Bethany also offers Dual Majors, which is a combination of two majors.

According to recent research, 95% of Bethany College graduates carry student loan debt, averaging $25,704.  The endowment fund in 2016 was worth $46.7 million. According to U. S. News tuition and fees are $28,444 and room and board costs $10,270 (2017–18). About 29% of Bethany students graduate in four years.

Notable alumni
Virginia Dare Aderholdt, an Arlington Hall cryptanalyst and Japanese translator, who decrypted the intercepted Japanese surrender message, August 14, 1945
 Joseph Baldwin (1852), educator and founder of Truman State University
 Walter M. Bortz III, educator and 23rd president of Hampden-Sydney College
 Thomas Buergenthal (1957), retired U.S. judge on the International Court of Justice
 James Beauchamp "Champ" Clark (1873), Democratic representative from Missouri and Speaker of the United States House of Representatives.
 Faith Daniels (1979), CBS and NBC news anchor
 Wilma Z. Davis (1912-2001), codebreaker during World War II and the Vietnam War
 Daniel Coleman DeJarnette Sr. (1822-1881) Democratic representative from Virginia, served in the United States House of Representatives and then in the Confederate Congress during the American Civil War. 
 Shane Douglas (1986), professional wrestler
 William Ferrel (1844), meteorologist
 Bob Goin (1959), athletic director in Florida State University and University of Cincinnati
 John William McGarvey (1829–1911), religious educator
 Sukhi Turner, mayor of Dunedin, New Zealand, during 1995–2004
 Caroline Gordon (1916), novelist and critic, author of Penhally
 Kaye Gorenflo Hearn, Justice of the Supreme Court of South Carolina.
 Edgar Odell Lovett (1890 [class valedictorian]), first president of Rice University.
 William H. Macy, Emmy Award-winning actor (attended; transferred to Goddard College.)
 Frances McDormand (1979), film,  television and stage actress and winner of four Academy Awards including Best Actress for Fargo (1996) and Three Billboards Outside Ebbing, Missouri (2017), and Best Picture and Best Actress for Nomadland (2020)
 Oliver S. Marshall (1850–1934), president of the West Virginia Senate 1899 to 1901 from Hancock County.
 Adrian Melott (1968), astrophysicist and cosmologist.
 John O. Pendleton (1871), United States Representative
 Tom Poston, Emmy Award-winning actor (attended but was not graduated from Bethany College)
 Jeffrey L. Seglin, (1978), writer of weekly column "The Right Thing," faculty member, John F. Kennedy School of Government at Harvard University
 Dave Sims (1975), Emmy Award-winning sportscaster
 Robert J. McCann (1980), Chief Executive Officer of UBS Group Americas
 George Tener Oliver (1868), United States Senator from Pennsylvania (1909 to 1917)
 Sid Gepford, NFL player
 Joseph Rucker Lamar (1877), Associate Justice, Supreme Court of the United States
 John E. Niederhuber, 13th director of the National Cancer Institute (NCI)

Notes

References

External links

 
 Official Bethany College athletics website

 
Buildings and structures in Brooke County, West Virginia
Education in Brooke County, West Virginia
Educational institutions established in 1840
Universities and colleges affiliated with the Christian Church (Disciples of Christ)
Private universities and colleges in West Virginia
Tourist attractions in Brooke County, West Virginia
1840 establishments in Virginia
Liberal arts colleges in West Virginia